The 1986–87 Polska Liga Hokejowa season was the 52nd season of the Polska Liga Hokejowa, the top level of ice hockey in Poland. 10 teams participated in the league, and Podhale Nowy Targ won the championship.

First round

Final round

Qualification round

Playoffs

Quarterfinals 
 Podhale Nowy Targ - Stoczniowiec Gdansk 2:0 (11:2, 9:3)
 Zagłębie Sosnowiec - GKS Tychy 2:1 (3:6, 2:1, 8:5)
 Naprzód Janów - ŁKS Łódź 2:0 (6:3, 8:4)
 Polonia Bytom - KS Cracovia 2:0 (12:1, 6:3)

Semifinals 
 Podhale Nowy Targ - Zagłębie Sosnowiec 2:1 (3:5, 3:2, 5:4 SO)
 Naprzód Janów - Polonia Bytom 0:2 (1:3, 5:6)

Final
 Podhale Nowy Targ - Polonia Bytom 2:1 (1:2, 4:3, 5:4)

Placing round

7th place 
 ŁKS Łódź - Stoczniowiec Gdansk 2:0 (8:6, 6:4)

5th place 
 GKS Tychy - KS Cracovia 1:2 (3:4, 8:6, 1:5)

3rd place 
 Naprzód Janów - Zagłębie Sosnowiec 2:1 (4:6, 11:3, 4:2)

Relegation 
 GKS Katowice - Polonia Bydgoszcz 2:0 (4:3, 4:2)

External links
 Season on hockeyarchives.info

1986-87
Pol
Liga